Nikolai Yuryevich Zhilyayev (born 5 March 1987) is a Russian former footballer.

External links
Profile on Official FC Amkar Website 

1987 births
Sportspeople from Nizhny Novgorod
Living people
Russian footballers
Russia under-21 international footballers
Association football midfielders
FC Zvezda Irkutsk players
FC Amkar Perm players
Russian Premier League players
FC Kuban Krasnodar players
FC Ufa players
FC Fakel Voronezh players
FC Tekstilshchik Ivanovo players
FC SKA Rostov-on-Don players
FC Lokomotiv Moscow players
FC Nizhny Novgorod (2015) players